Richmond Township is one of the twenty-seven townships of Ashtabula County, Ohio, United States. The 2010 census found 938 people in the township.

Geography
Located on the eastern edge of the county, it borders the following townships:
Pierpont Township - north
Conneaut Township, Crawford County, Pennsylvania - east
North Shenango Township, Crawford County, Pennsylvania - southeast
Andover Township - south
Cherry Valley Township - southwest corner
Dorset Township - west
Denmark Township - northwest corner

No municipalities are located in Richmond Township.

Name and history
Statewide, the only other Richmond Township is located in Huron County.

The township was first settled in 1806. Richmond Township was organized in 1828. In later years, it became a center for the Underground Railroad.

Government
The township is governed by a three-member board of trustees, who are elected in November of odd-numbered years to a four-year term beginning on the following January 1. Two are elected in the year after the presidential election and one is elected in the year before it. There is also an elected township fiscal officer, who serves a four-year term beginning on April 1 of the year after the election, which is held in November of the year before the presidential election. Vacancies in the fiscal officership or on the board of trustees are filled by the remaining trustees.  Currently, the board is composed of chairman Thomas Hitchcock and members David Ballentine and Allen Slater.

References

External links
County website

Townships in Ashtabula County, Ohio
Townships in Ohio
Populated places on the Underground Railroad
1828 establishments in Ohio
Populated places established in 1828